Dmitri Ivanov may refer to:
 Dmitry Ivanov (weightlifter) (1928–1993), Russian weightlifter
 Dmytro Ivanov (born 1989), Ukrainian footballer with FC Nyva Ternopil
 Dzmitry Ivanow (born 1997), Belarusian footballer with FC Vitebsk
 Dmitri Ivanov (footballer, born 1970), Russian footballer with FC Krylia Sovetov Samara, FC Torpedo Moscow, FC Rotor Volgograd, FC Uralan Elista, FC Rostov and FC Rubin Kazan
 Dmitri Ivanov (footballer, born 1987), Russian footballer with FC Rostov and FC Anzhi Makhachkala
 Dmitri Ivanov (footballer, born 1994), Russian footballer with FC Baltika Kaliningrad
 Dmitri Ivanov (footballer, born 2000), Russian footballer with FC Krasnodar
 Dmitry Pavlovich Ivanov (ru), Hero of the Soviet Union
 Dmitry Trofimovich Ivanov (ru), Hero of the Soviet Union
 Dmitriy Ivanov (decathlete) (born 1977), Russian decathlete and medallist at the 1999 European Athletics U23 Championships